"Hooligans" is a song by Dutch producer Don Diablo and British musician Example. The single was released on 28 June 2009 through Data Records. The song was written by Don Diablo, who also produced it, and Example. It includes remixes by Noisia, A1 Bassline, Spor, Doorly and Don himself. It is the vocal version of Diablo's 2008 instrumental track "Hooligans Never Surrender", a single from (and the hidden bonus track of) his album Life Is a Festival. "Hooligans" marks one of Example's first moves away from the underground rap scene toward a more mainstream audience as it was his first major label release. Gleave signed to Data Records after the folding of The Streets' label The Beats. Although an independent single release, a VIP mix of the song, featuring additional production from DJ Wire's remix, was included in Example's second studio album, Won't Go Quietly.

Music video
A music video was publishing to YouTube on 6 May 2009 through the Data Records UK channel. The video itself, lasting a duration of four minutes and twenty-two seconds, starts off with an impatient man trying to get into a rave party. After getting in, Don and Example are seen performing in front of a crowd of people. In the meanwhile, the man is no longer seen throughout the video. Diablo and Example are often performing while crowd surfing. The video was deemed explicit due to its multiple references of rave party mentality with sex, drugs and alcohol.

Track listing

Chart performance
Despite the song's popularity, it has not made any major chart performances. However, it reached number 15 on the UK Dance Chart.

Weekly charts

Release history

References 

2009 singles
Don Diablo songs
Example (musician) songs
2009 songs
Songs written by Example (musician)
Data Records singles
Songs written by Don Diablo